This is a list of things named after Kazi Nazrul Islam, Bengali poet, writer, musician, anti-colonial activist and the national poet of Bangladesh. Popularly known as Nazrul.
 Nazrul Geeti, refers to the songs written and composed by Kazi Nazrul Islam.
 Nazrul Jayanti, the birthday of Kazi Nazrul Islam celebrated by various schools, colleges & universities of Bengal, and also celebrated by Bengalis around the world.

Organizations
 Nazrul Institute
 Bangladesh Nazrul Sena
 Nazrul Endowment
 Nazrul Academy; Maghbazar, Dhaka

Educational institutions
 Jatiya Kabi Kazi Nazrul Islam University
 Kazi Nazrul University
 Kabi Nazrul Government College
 Kabi Nazrul College
 Kazi Nazrul Islam Mahavidyalaya
 Nazrul Sena School
 Nazrul Centenary Polytechnic
 Kabi Nazrul Govt. Primary School, Narayanganj, Bangladesh

Buildings
 Nazrul Mancha
 Nazrul Tirtha
 Nazrul Mancha (Kamarhati)

Streets
 Kazi Nazrul Islam Sarani, Kolkata
 Kabi Nazrul School Road, Bandar, Narayanganj, Bangladesh
 Kazi Nazrul Islam Avenue , Shahbagh,Dhaka, Bangladesh

Station and Airport
 Kazi Nazrul Islam Airport
 Kavi Nazrul metro station

References 

Kazi Nazrul Islam
Kazi Nazrul Islam